Wired Shut is a 2021 Canadian horror thriller film directed by Alexander Sharp, starring Blake Stadel, Natalie Sharp and Behtash Fazlali.

Cast
 Blake Stadel as Reed Rodney
 Natalie Sharp as Em
 Behtash Fazlali as Preston

Release
The film was released on 30 November 2021 via digital and VOD and on DVD on 25 January 2022.

Reception
Robin Pierce of Starburst rated the film 3 stars out of 5. Michael Pementel of Bloody Disgusting gave the film a score of 3 out of 5, writing, "Compared to a lot of other films in the subgenre, Wired Shut proves to be an effective home invasion thriller with heart."

References

External links
 
 

Canadian horror films
2021 horror films
Canadian thriller films
2021 thriller films
Canadian horror thriller films
2021 horror thriller films
2020s Canadian films